Pilocrocis angulifera is a moth in the family Crambidae. It was described by George Hamilton Kenrick in 1912. It is found in Papua New Guinea.

References

Pilocrocis
Moths described in 1912
Moths of New Guinea